The Caste based violence in Bihar has a history of long drawn conflict between the Forward Castes, who controlled vast swathes of land and the Lower Castes who were mostly poor. The Zamindari abolition and Communist upsurge in Bihar gave rise to a tug of war between upper and the lower caste. But, the tussle between the Marxists and the proprietors was not divided on caste lines, as some of the middle peasant castes were also proprietors. The decade of 1960s witnessed communist upsurge  in the Bhojpur region of Bihar led by Jagdish Mahto under the banner of Communist Party of India (Marxist–Leninist) Liberation while the 1990s saw dreaded caste wars. The belligerents were Dalits and poor peasantry of middle peasant castes, who were fighting for their rights with the supporters of status-quoism i.e. upper castes as well as affluent section of the middle peasant castes (Yadav, Kurmi and Koeri). Its first mass leader was Jagdish Mahto, a koeri teacher who had read ambedkar before he discovered marx and started a paper in the town of Arrah called Harijanistan("dalit land").  Religious sentiments also becomes the cause of bitter strife many a times. The violence that happened in Bhagalpur is a precedent.

Laxmanpur Bathe massacre, 1996

Laxmanpur Bathe massacre was a sanguinary act of the Ranvir Sena, a militia dominated by Bhumihar caste. In the village called Laxmanpur Bathe, nearly 56 Dalits including women and the children were killed. The trial which followed the massacre revealed the implicit involvement of some of the major political parties and the leaders of the Bihar. It was also claimed that the police force which was deployed there to protect the villagers assisted the Sena members to launch the assault on the Dalits.

Parasbigha and Dohia incidents 1979-80
Parasbigha and Dohia which were located few kilometres south of Patna were disturbed area since abolition of Zamindari in 1950. The contest for grabbing more and more lands from the erstwhile Tekari Raj brought Yadavs and Bhumihars against each other. The Yadavs here sided with Dalits in long and protracted struggle, which reached its zenith in 1979, when an attack took place at Parasbigha by the Bhumihars in which 11 people including one Yadav were killed. The Bhumihars attacked in retaliation of the action of Yadav led Dalit naxalites who beheaded a notorious Bhumihar landlord, few days ago. Two days after Parasbigha killings, the Yadavs descended upon the Dohia village in search of Bhumihar perpetrators who diffused soon after the incident of Parasbigha from latter's village. Since the men were not found the Yadavs raped their girls, killed an old women and disappeared after looting the village.

Pipra Massacre, 1979-80
Pipra is a village in Jehanabad district, here the landowners are Kurmi, a backward caste. In the past the land owners were Muslim zamindars who left the village during partition with the help of their Dalit kamias, against the wish of many Kurmis who planned to burn the Muslim houses. Later the zamindars sold their land to the Kurmi buyers who started expecting respect from Dalit workers at par with older zamindars. With time, Dalits became sympathetic to the Naxal Movement. Things worsened due to a drought in 1978-79, which made their condition desperate. In December 1979, Naxals killed a Kurmi landlord, in retaliation to which on February 25, 1980, heavily armed men attacked Dalit houses in Pipra village. 27 houses were burnt and 5 women, 3 adults and 6 children were killed.

1983, Munger massacre
In a bloody showdown in Munger district of Bihar on the south bank of Ganges, the Yadavs killed 4 men of the Dhanuk caste . In the same year the Dhanuks in vendetta kidnapped fourteen children of the Yadavs from Piparia village and crossed the river to gather fodder. Except three, all the children were murdered and the dead bodies were chopped into pieces so that they could never be identified.

Munger-Chhotaki Chhechani-Darmian massacres, 1985
In 1985 in a series of attack and retribution between Rajputs and Yadavs, three subsequent massacres took place in Munger district of Bihar. There was a land dispute between Yadavs and Rajputs. The later had brought Bhinds, a tribal caste  for cultivating the disputed land. The Yadavs descended the village on horses and foot and nine people died in the attack. The raiders also plundered four hundred houses of the inhabiting Rajputs. An infant girl was also killed during the raid.

In a separate event in 1986 at Chhotki Chhechani village, Rajput raiders killed seven Yadavs. Following the event, the Yadav in the Darmian village in the subsequent year killed 11 Rajputs in retribution.

Dalelchak-Bhagaura massacre 1987

In the Dalelchak-Bhagaura village of Aurangabad district of Bihar, the dispute over hundreds of acre of land between Yadav and Rajput community was the principal cause of the carnage, in which over 50 Rajputs were killed by Maoist Communist Centre, an organisation dominated by Yadavs. The massacre also resulted in the exodus of 40 Rajput families and from the village. Chief Minister Bindeshwari Dubey announced the relief for the victim families in the form of government jobs. Later, some of the convicts were given death sentence by the court, while majority of them remained out of reach.

The massacre of Dalelchak-Baguaura is considered as one of the biggest caste based massacre in the history of Bihar along with Laxmanpur Bathe. In this particular incident, which took place in the twin villages of Aurangabad district of Bihar, writers Ashok Kumar and SK Ghosh have mentioned that the massacre of men and women took place after the rapes of the Rajput women by the perpetrators. The writers have talked about rape of women of all ages, even those above 60 years of age. But the other sources only describe brutal killings of men, women and children with no mention of rape.

Shankarbigha massacre 1999
The infamous massacre led to assassination of 23 Dalit people including men and women of the Shankarbigha village. The prime accused of the carnage were the members of Ranvir Sena, a militia of Bhumihar landlords, while the sufferers were Dalits. In 1999 most of the accused were acquitted by a court based in Jahanabad.

Bara massacre 1992

In the "Bara massacre" the 37 members of Bhumihar caste were slain by the Maoist Communist Centre. According to the report of India Today, Yadav leaders of Janata Dal were accused of instigating the violence against the Bhumihars after killing of ten Dalits in Barsimha village by "Savarana Liberation Front", an upper-caste organisation. A court later tried the perpetrators. The upper caste retaliated by killing 56 Dalits at Laxmanpur Bathe. One of the main accused of the massacre, Ram Chandra Yadav was proven guilty in March 2023 in a trial Court of Bihar. The Maoist Communist Centre of India claimed that the killings were a response to attack on Dalits elsewhere, by the Savarna Liberation Front, another militant organisation.

1998 Rampur Chauram massacre
In 1998, 9 persons were killed while returning from the cremation of a fellow villager, Suresh Sharma in Rampur Chauram village of Arwal district. All the victims belonged to Bhumihar caste. In 2015, a division bench of Patna High Court acquitted fourteen accused of the massacre, due to lack of evidences. Earlier, the convicts were tried at the lower court but they moved to Patna High Court against the descision of trial court. Some of the main accused, out of fourteen acquitted by court included, Ramadhar Yadav, Rampravesh Ram, Umesh Sah, Bhagwan Sah and Rajkumar Mochi.

Bathani Tola massacre 1996

In Bathani Tola, a village located in Bhojpur region of Bihar. The members of Ranvir Sena including people of Bhumihar and Rajput caste killed 21 Dalits. The victims included women, children and infant also. A session court of Arrah inflicted capital punishment upon three perpetrators while other were given life imprisonment. The Patna High Court however acquitted all of them citing lack of evidence as the reason.

Afsar massacre 2000

Afsar massacre was a part of long running caste wars between Bhumihars and the Kurmi-Koeri caste in Nawada and Sheikhpura region of Bihar. Two rival gangs one led by Akhilesh Singh and another one led by Ashok Mahto were active here. These gangs were aligned on the caste lines and drew support from their respective castes. The war claimed 200 lives in all. In this particular incident 12 relatives of Akhilesh Singh, whose wife was an MLA from the region were murdered by the Ashok Mahto gang. The Mahto gang was also responsible for assassination of Rajo Singh, a member of parliament.

Belchhi massacre 1977
In 1970s, the Belchhi village in Bihar witnessed one of the severest massacre of Bihar's history. The root cause of the massacre was caste conflict between Paswan landless peasants and Kurmi landlords. This massacre parted the way between Kurmis and Paswans and made them sceptical of each other's activities in all spheres of life. Mahavir Mahto was the main accused of the carnage in which Dusadh people were the victim.

Senari massacre 1999
In the Senari village (now in Arwal district of Bihar) the dreaded naxalite organisation MCC killed 34 Bhumihars. The naxalite unit was dominated particularly by Yadav and Paswans. The convicts included Bacchesh Singh, Buddhan Yadav, Butai Yadav, Satendra Das, Lallan Pasi, Dwarika Paswan, Kariban Paswan, Godai Paswan, Uma Paswan and Gopal Paswan, who were later tried by the Session court. The victims were killed using blunt objects with utmost severity.

Bhojpur Killings (1971–76)

Bhojpur is a historical region in Bihar, most often known for its association with Ujjainiya Rajputs. The region is also known for worst form of landlordism which was the cause of popular movement called "Bhojpur rebellion" led by newly educated backward caste youths namely Jagdish Mahto, Rameswar Ahir, Ramnaresh Ram, Maharaj Mahto who took up arms against the landlord class when mobilised by communists. Between 1971 and 1976 as Santosh Singh estimated a large number of Bhumihar landlords and landlords of other upper-caste were killed. After Mahto's death the movement faded away bringing long lasting peace in the region.

Danwar-Bihta massacre 1989
Danwar-Bihta massacre took place in 1989 in the Bhojpur district of Bihar. The Upper Caste landlords earlier used to capture the polling booths and made the Dalits vote in favour of their preferred candidates, in order to secure political power in their own hand. The Dalits in the village of Danwar-Bihta took up a resolution in 1989 to vote as per their own wish. The local Rajput landlords thus massacred 23 Dalits in order to punish them. One of the prime accused of the massacre was Jwala Singh, who was important political figure in the region and he is said to have ensured that no Dalit could cast his vote in the forthcoming elections.

Bhagalpur massacre 1989

In 1989, the ghastly massacre of Muslims in Bhagalpur district of Bihar had its roots originating from the "Ram Mandir movement" at Ayodhya. The trigger to the weeks long communal riots was the incident of Rajpur village, where a procession of Hindus aimed at garnering support for the temple movement was attacked with a Petrol bomb from the local Muslim community. The provocative slogans like "Hindi Hindu Hindustan, Mulla bhago Pakistan"(India is for Hindus, Muslims should go away to Pakistan) & "Jab jab Hindu jaga hai, tab tab katua bhaga hai"(whenever the Hindu has risen, those who are circumcised have run) were shouted by the mob which culminated into the attack finally leading to a long communal strife in which over 1000 people died.

The riots broke out in whole district when rumours of killings of Hindu boys spread. Some of the most affected areas were Logain and Chandheri village, where Muslims were slaughtered and were thrown in wells and buried in cauliflower field respectively. The N.N Singh Committee set up to enquire into the case blamed Chief Minister Satyendra Narayan Singh and his government for not taking required action to save the lives and property. In the infamous Logain massacre (a part of 1989 Bhagalpur violence which occurred in Logain village), which took place on 27 October 1989, a mob guided by Assistant Sub-inspector of Police, Ramchandra Singh massacred 116 Muslims. In 2007, 14 people were convicted in the same case. Almost all the convicts belonged to intermediary Koeri caste. However, the villagers of the 14 convicts charged the verdict as conspiracy. Sunil Kumar Kushwaha, relative of one of the accused, alleged that the police framed the innocent villagers as the perpetrators, as they failed in arresting the real perpetrators, who were outsiders.

Khagaria Massacre 2009
In October 2009, sixteen people, including four children, were dragged out of their huts, tied and gunned down in Bihar's Khagaria district. Out of the 16 dead, 14 people belonged to Kurmi community while 2 belonged to Kushwaha community. While there were suspicions of the massacre being carried out by a Maoist organization, the police claimed that it was a fallout of on old dispute between kurmi-koeris and Musahar community over riverine land. Based on testimonials by the survivors, most of the alleged perpetrators belonged to a dalit caste, Musahar.

Chhotan Shukla-Brij Bihari gang wars 1994
Chhotan Shukla was the brother of former MLA of Vaishali, Munna Shukla. He used to operate a gang in the region which was in tussle with the rival gang of Brij Bihari Prasad, an OBC Bania minister in the cabinet of Lalu Prasad Yadav. Prasad was also known for his muscleman image. In an attack by the Prasad gang, Chhotan was killed along with a large number of his associates. In return Prasad was also assassinated. During Chhotan's funeral procession when Gopalganj District Magistrate, G.Krishnaiah was trying to control the furious mob he was beaten up to death by the participants in the procession which are said to be provoked by Anand Mohan Singh and Munna Shukla for doing so.

Caste based gangwars in Kosi region 1990-91
In the Kosi region of Bihar, two caste based gangs led by Anand Mohan Singh and Pappu Yadav operated, which were formed to secure the interest of Rajputs and the  Backward Castes. In 1991, Anand Mohan organised massive protests against the Mandal Commission's recommendation and in the defiance of the rule of Lalu Prasad Yadav. The members of Yadav's gang in this region terrorised the Rajputs by looting their crops and grazing their fields. The violent campaign of Pappu Yadav in this region led many Rajputs and Bhumihars flee the Yadav dominated villages.

Nadhi massacre 1996
In 1996, in the Bhojpur district of Bihar, the infamous Nadhi massacre took place. This massacre resulted in retaliatory attacks by the victim Bhumihars on the Schedule Castes, who were perpetrators of this ghastly massacre, in the same year in another incident. In the Nadhi village, the CPI(ML) unit consisting SCs killed 9 people belonging to Bhumihar caste.

Rohtas riots 2013
In the Baddi village of Rohtas district, the issue of location of a Ravidas temple led to a clash between Rajputs and the Chamars. The villagers belonging to Chamar caste alleged that a mob of Rajputs attacked the village which resulted in death of one person while 54 others including women and children were severely injured. Other sources indicate number of injured to be 40. As per the reports from the victims, it was revealed that the attackers set the Ravidas temple on fire and vandalised the idol. This was followed by sloganeering in the favour of a freedom fighter belonging to Rajput caste and alleged beating of the people belonging to Chamar community. In a briefing given to The Hindu, Sarju Ram, son of an injured victim stated that the location of temple to the centre of village which represents the "assertion of Dalits" led the Rajputs to attack.

Madhubani massacre 2021
In 2021, on the occasion of Holi festival, a clash happened between the militia called "Ravan Sena", ran by members of the Brahmin community and the local Rajput inhabitants in the village called Mahmudpur in Madhubani. The accused, Pravin Jha was patronized by local leaders of the Bharatiya Janata Party. In this incident, 5 members of the Rajput caste from same family, which included an ex-armyman were killed by the Ravan Sena. Amongst those arrested for conspiracy included a non-FIR accused Prahlad Mahto, who was named as he had provided shelter to Jha and his associates.

Chhapra mob lynching 2023
In February 2023, in the Mubarakpur village of Chhapra, which is located in the Saran district of Bihar, a high-profile mob lynching occurred. It was also based on the caste line, as a local leader of the ruling Rashtriya Janata Dal, Vijay Yadav, who was also the husband of incumbent Mukhiya, was the alleged perpetrator. The violence occurred when three youth belonging to Rajput caste visited his poultry farm and allegedly fired upon him. In retaliation, the youths were beaten brutally by Yadav and his kinsmen, leading to death of a young man named Amitesh Singh. The other Rajput youths got injuries. This case was echoed at the state level by the media and resulted in increase of bitterness among the Rajputs and Yadav in the Chhapra.

See also
Caste-related violence in India
 2018 Bihar riots
Sunlight Sena

References

Further reading

Caste-related violence in India
Massacres in India
Anti-Brahminism
History of Bihar (1947–present)
Crime in Bihar
Caste-related violence in Bihar
Bihar-related lists